Andreas Pelekoudas (born July 27, 1987) is a Greek professional basketball player. He is a 2.08 m (6 ft 10 in) tall center.

Professional career
Pelekoudas spent the 2007–12 seasons with the Greek club Esperos Patras, playing in the semi-pro 3rd tier division of Greek basketball. In 2012, he signed with the Greek 1st Division club Apollon Patras.

References

External links
Myplayer Profile
DraftExpress.com Profile
Eurobasket.com Profile

1987 births
Living people
Greek men's basketball players
Greek Basket League players
Centers (basketball)
Power forwards (basketball)
Basketball players from Patras